10 Terrorists is a 2012 Australian black comedy film, directed by Dee McLachlan. Dee is best known for her direction in the award-winning 2007 film The Jammed.

Plot
Originally titled Who Wants To Be a Terrorist, the film follows 10 wannabe terrorists that compete in a series of challenges to win $1 million.

Cast
Jackie Diamond ... Judge Rosalinda Olivera Sanchez
Sachin Joab ... Judge Miki Miraj
Richard Cawthorne ... Judge MI6
Kendal Rae ... Simone Price, Host
Matt Hetherington ... Sam Brown, Canadian Contestant
Leah de Niese ... Sri Lankan Activist - Cat
Veronica Sywak ... Eco-Terrorist - Terra
Jasper Bagg	 ... WWTBAT Producer
Osamah Sami ... Persian Activist - Azim
Julie Eckersley ...	Show's Psychologist
Samir Malik ... Somali Pirate - Yah Yah
Adam Pierzchalski ... Polish Thug - Kret
Louise Crawford	... Reporter at Bomb Site
Ratidzo Mambo ... Fame Contestant - Cleopatra
Masa Yamaguchi ... Ryuichi, Japanese Contestant
Frieda McKenna ... Ying, Chinese Contestant
Melissa Bergland ... Car Hijack Victim

References

External links

Official Website

Australian black comedy films
Films directed by Dee McLachlan
2010s Australian films